Richard Poole may refer to:

 Richard Poole (physician) (1783–1871), Scottish phrenologist
 Richard Poole (footballer) (born 1957), English footballer
 Richard Poole (character), fictional detective from the Death in Paradise TV series

See also
 Dick Poole (disambiguation)